Little Robots is a British stop-motion animated children's television series, produced by Cosgrove Hall Films for Create TV & Film and broadcast on CBeebies (the BBC's children's channel). The series was based on the eponymous book by Mike Brownlow in 1999, published by Ragged Bears Publishing.

Characters
 Tiny Robot (voiced by Hayley Carmichael and Jules de Jongh in the American dub) is the central character of the show. He is turquoise, has a pink antenna on top of his head, and a pink button on his belly which opens the lid of his head, uncovering a few tools which he uses for fixing robots and other machines. He is also responsible for pulling the Day-Night Lever at the right times. Tiny lives on the Nut and Bolt Tree, right next to the Day-Night Lever. He is also the smallest of a family of millirobots known as the Little Robots. He always has a positive view on things and tries to help his family to live in peace and harmony together. Tiny is very mature for his age. Although what everyone doesn't know in the series that Tiny was mayor of a robot habitat in a scrapyard, despite being one of the younger Little Robots. And as the series continued he has taken part of other jobs like fixing robots, putting his discy lift under inspection and even saving robots from the scrap.
 Messy Robot (vocal effects performed by Jimmy Hibbert) is Tiny's pet dog. He loves things dirty and messy. Scary teaches him tricks and makes shows with him, where he's known as "Messy the Wonderhound". It may be possible that some of Messy's vocal effects may have been recycled from the character Bumpy Dog (another dog character), from one of Cosgrove Hall's previous shows): Noddy's Toyland Adventures, which Hibbert also voiced characters in.
 Sporty Robot (voiced by Lenny Henry and Paul Mitchell-Jones in the American dub) is the strongest and fittest of the Little Robots. he's constantly running, playing games and sports, and never gets tired of making himself stronger and fitter. Sporty has his own, private gym with a trampoline and a conveyor belt.
 Stretchy Robot (voiced by Jimmy Hibbert and Adam Sims in the American dub) is a very organized and efficient dark blue Little Robot. He's in charge of sorting the junk that comes from the chute on the junkyard. He's tall and thin and has a long, flexible neck. Though his main worry is to keep the junkyard organized so his family can use, his workaholism and obsession for organisation sometimes causes problems. He lives in the junkyard, inside an abandoned radiator.
 Rusty Robot (voiced by Morwenna Banks and Maria Darling in the American dub) is a feminine and sensitive steam-powered Little Robot who gets nervous at times. She has a red dress which is made of painted rusty metal and wears a funnel-like wig on top of her head. She lives in an old, rusty bucket, and she constantly has new ideas on how to improve and decorate it. She is very impulsive and accidentally prone, though, and tense situations or anything that causes her to get overexcited can make her overheat and release puffs of steam from her wig. She also has a childish crush on Sporty.
 Stripy Robot (voiced by Martin Clunes and Tom Clarke-Hill in the American dub) is a big Little Robot made with coloured stripes of metal, he's practically the complete opposite of Sporty: moves and talks slowly, but he's a deep and introspective thinker, also a specialist in flowers and storytelling. His best friend is Teddy and his favorite activities are taking care of his garden, telling stories to his family and playing games that require little agility and much skill. He is the third oldest and largest of the Little Robots and he is gentle.
 Noisy Robot (voiced by Su Pollard and Maria Darling in the American dub) is a red Little Robot who speaks very loudly, has a trumpet for a nose, plays instruments, writes and sings songs, and loves whatever kind of noise she can produce. Her house is an old drum, with a xylophone-themed entryway. Her passion for loud music and noise can often be bothersome for her family, but she's also a great entertainer.
 Spotty Robot (voiced by Emma Chambers and Laurel Lefkow in the American dub) is a round, heavy, yellow, wheel-like Little Robot covered in colored spots who wears specs and can retract all her limbs and roll around like a ball for fast locomotion. She has a strong personality, likes rules and orders, and tends to give orders to her family (often causing conflicts with her family). In some episodes of the show she has a glassy front which means that there is a reflection of a studio member and camera throughout the series. She is the oldest Little Robot of the series.
 Scary Robot (voiced by Mike Hayley) is a purple Little Robot with a black cape. He is a great actor with a Donald Sinden-esque voice and likes to scare his family (though he's often not successful) and stage shows to entertain his family. He has his own stage, which is also his house.
 Flappy Robot (vocal effects performed by Jimmy Hibbert) is a character from the show who is Scary's pet bat.
 The Sparky Sparklette Robot Twins (voiced by Mel Giedroyc and Sue Perkins, Lizzie Waterworth and Joanna Ruiz in the American dub) are an arguably greenish blue Little Robot couple with different coloured belly buttons. The twins are almost identical, are full of energy, love dancing, and doing practical jokes on other robots. Sparky One has a pink spot on her belly and Sparky Two has a yellow spot on her belly. They are able to communicate over distances by exchanging electrical rays through the antennae on their heads, and their catch phrase is Gimme three, Sparky!. They live in a pair of speakers by an old record turntable.
 Other characters include Teddy Robot, who is Stripy's metallic, silver pet bear, and the Robot Robo-Birds (vocal effects performed by Jimmy Hibbert), who are his twin pet birds that often play important roles on the show.

Crew
Franc Vose, producer
Bridget Appleby, Art Director
Vanessa Chapman, Executive Producer
Michael Carrington, Executive Producer
Brain Cosgrove, Executive Producer
Mark Hall, Executive Producer
Theresa Plummer-Andrews, Executive Producer
Bob Heatlie, composer
Hilary Baverstock, Script Editor
Mellie Buse, writer
Jimmy Hibbert, writer
Neil Arksey, writer

Development
The series was originally in development by the motion-picture division of Lego Media, a subsidiary of The Lego Group that produced video games and TV shows based on Lego products and properties. which rebranded to Create TV and Film in 2003.

On 7 October 2001, it was confirmed that the BBC had acquired the UK broadcast rights to the show and that production would start on the series, which would begin to air from January 2003. In December of that year, it was confirmed that BBC Worldwide had acquired worldwide distribution rights to the series, and that the Australian Broadcasting Corporation had purchased the Australian broadcast rights to the series.

In March 2003, BBC Worldwide pre-sold the series to many different broadcasters, including ZDF and KiKA in Germany, TVOntario, SCN and Knowledge Network in Canada, and the NRK in Norway.

The series was redubbed in the United States with voice actors using American accents despite the show already being in English.

Tiny, Stretchy, Sporty, Scary, and Noisy would later appear in The Official BBC Children in Need Medley in 2009

Episodes

Series 1 (2003)

Series 2 (2003)

Series 3 (2004)

Series 4 (2004)

Series 5 (2005)

Release
BBC Worldwide distributes the series, and licensed it in over 60 countries.  In the U.S., Little Robots was part of Cartoon Network's Tickle-U programming block and premiered 2 years after it aired in the UK, in 2005, the Cartoon Network version used American voice actors also was released on DVD by 20th Century Fox Home Entertainment, and on Qubo aired reruns of the series from 18 April 2011 to 25 May 2014, but with used the American dub as well. It is also aired on TVOKids in Ontario, Canada from 2003 to 2005 and used the original UK dub, on Disney Channel in Asia, on Okto in Singapore, and on Nick Jr. in Australia (formerly for a short time on Nickelodeon). The BBC website lists further customers: Germany (ZDF and KiKa), Canada (TVOntario, SCN and The Knowledge Network), Norway (NRK), Finland (YLE), Denmark (TV2), Iceland (RUV), Italy (RAI 2), Portugal (RTP and Canal Panda), Malta (MEBC), Russia (RTR Kultura) and South Africa (SABC), Mexico (Discovery Kids), Slovenia (TV Slovenia), Japan (NHK and Disney Junior). The series has also aired in several other countries such as Australia (ABC, ABC Kids, ABC1 and ABC2), New Zealand (TV2), Ireland (RTÉ2, where it aired as part of its children's television strand The Den), The Bahamas (ZNS-TV), Hong Kong (ATV World), Poland (CBeebies), Greece (NERIT), Middle East and North Africa (Spacetoon and Basmah).

Duplo
In 2003−2004 a number of construction toy sets based on the TV series were released by Lego Explore. In this theme were introduced new elements, including pieces for character minifigures. Each of the sets consist only one minifigure, except "7439 Stretchy's Junk Yard" (Stretchy, Sporty) and "7441 Tiny & Friends" (Tiny, Stretchy, and exclusive minifigures of Noisy and Messy). Also were made character plush toys. Most of the sets had limited release and were available only for online shopping in countries where the TV series was screened.

References

External links
 
Official website

2003 British television series debuts
2005 British television series endings
2000s British children's television series
2000s British animated television series
2000s preschool education television series
BBC children's television shows
TVO original programming
British children's animated science fiction television series
British preschool education television series
Animated preschool education television series
Animated television series about robots
British stop-motion animated television series
British television shows based on children's books
English-language television shows
Television series by Cosgrove Hall Films
CBeebies